"I Hurt for You" is a song co-written and recorded by American country music artist Deborah Allen.  It was released in May 1984 as the third single from the album Cheat the Night.  The song reached #10 on the Billboard Hot Country Singles & Tracks chart.  The song was written by Allen and Rafe Van Hoy.

The album version of the song is different from the single version, which adds more harmony vocals and features a different drum and percussion arrangement.

Conway Twitty recorded a version of the song in 1993 and it was included on his final studio album Final Touches.

Chart performance

References

1984 singles
Deborah Allen songs
Conway Twitty songs
Songs written by Deborah Allen
RCA Records singles
Songs written by Rafe Van Hoy
1983 songs